Saam TV is the Sakal media group's first venture into broadcast media business.Mr Prasanna Joshi is the  head of the channel.

Current broadcast

Former broadcast
Mission Dosti.com
Rang Maza Vegla

External links
Saam TV website

References

Television stations in Mumbai
Marathi-language television channels
Mass media in Mumbai
Mass media in Maharashtra